The Managed Heart: Commercialization of Human Feeling, by Arlie Russell Hochschild, was first published in 1983. A 20th Anniversary edition with a new afterword added by the author was published in 2003. It was reissued in 2012 with a new preface. It has been translated into German (Campus Press), Chinese (Laureate Books, Taipei, Taiwan), Japanese (Sekai Shisosha, Kyoto, Japan), Polish (Polish Scientific Publishers PWN), and French (La Découverte, 2017).  Hochschild's text is seminal and scholars like Sarah J. Tracy and Stephen Fineman have expanded on her concept of emotional labor.

References

1983 non-fiction books
Books about emotions
English-language books